Ulf Wallin is a Swedish classical violinist.

Life 
Born in Växjö, Wallin studied at the Royal College of Music, Stockholm and at the Universität für Musik und darstellende Kunst Wien. He began his career as a soloist and chamber music player. Later he taught as a visiting scholar at the University of Music and Performing Arts Vienna and the Hochschule für Musik Detmold. Since 1996 he's holding a professorship at the Hochschule für Musik "Hanns Eisler" in Berlin.

He has released more than 45 CDs, among others in 2011 and 2012 in two new recordings of R. Schumann's violin concerto. The Robert Schumann Philharmonic of Chemnitz under the direction of Frank Beermann played with him the concertante violin works (also the violin version of Schumann's cello concerto); he himself recorded with the pianist Roland Pöntinen the three violin sonatas.

Prize 
Together with Jon W. Finson, Wallin won the Robert Schumann Prize of the City of Zwickau in 2013. After Hansheinz Schneeberger, who was the only violinist among the Robert Schumann Prize winners in 1995, he was only the second violinist to receive this prize.

On 12 May 2014, Wallin was elected a member of the Royal Swedish Academy of Music.

References

External links 
 Website
 
 

Date of birth missing (living people)
Living people
People from Växjö
Swedish classical violinists
Royal College of Music, Stockholm alumni
University of Music and Performing Arts Vienna alumni
Members of the Royal Swedish Academy of Music
Academic staff of the Hochschule für Musik Hanns Eisler Berlin
Year of birth missing (living people)